Marshall Nunatak is a somewhat isolated rock nunatak,  east-southeast of the FitzGerald Bluffs in Ellsworth Land, Antarctica. The nunatak was mapped by the United States Geological Survey (USGS) from surveys and U.S. Navy air photos, 1961–66, and was named by the Advisory Committee on Antarctic Names for William F. Marshall, a USGS Topographic Engineer in Antarctica, 1967–68.

References

Nunataks of Ellsworth Land